In the Fishtank 9 is an album of songs by alternative rock bands Sonic Youth, the Instant Composers Pool Orchestra, and the Ex. It was released in 2001 on the Konkurrent label.

Reception

Thom Jurek of Allmusic praised the collaboration as "a wonder", praising the fact that "everyone participates in creating something fresh and new, without anybody getting in anybody else's way. The spirit of cooperation and the excitement of discovery here are both prescient. The result is neither rock nor jazz, but a free-form music that dispenses with formality and ego and goes for the heart of the thing itself." He concludes: "For nearly a half-hour, the listener gets to eavesdrop on the purest kind of music-making by those dedicated to nothing else than the pursuit of its creation."

Track listing
"III" – 3:27
"IV" – 4:28
"V" – 2:45
"VI" – 3:03
"VII" – 4:14
"VIII" – 2:16
"IX" – 3:24
"X" – 5:49

References

External links
Konkurrent

09
The Ex (band) albums
Split EPs
2002 compilation albums
2002 EPs
Sonic Youth compilation albums
Konkurrent compilation albums